Dracunculus canariensis is a species of Dracunculus found in Canary Islands and Madeira

References

External links

Aroideae
Flora of Madeira